is a Japanese politician who has served as the Minister of State for Economic Security since August 2022. A member of the Liberal Democratic Party, she has served in the House of Representatives since 2005, and had also served in several ministerial posts under Prime Minister Shinzo Abe. In 2021, she was a candidate in the Liberal Democratic Party leadership election, but was ultimately eliminated in a run-off, placing third.

Takaichi has been described as having a "political reputation as a staunch conservative".

Early life
Born and raised in the city of Nara, Takaichi graduated from Unebi Senior High School, Kobe University, and the Matsushita Institute of Government and Management. In 1987, she moved to the United States to work for Democratic U.S. Representative Patricia Schroeder as a Congressional Fellow. When she returned to Japan in 1989, she gained attention from the mass media as a legislative analyst with experience in the US Congress, and wrote books based on the experience. In 1992, she formed the Kansai Hi-Vision Consortium and presided as the first chairperson.

Political career
Takaichi was first elected to the House of Representatives in the 1993 Japanese general election. She joined the "Liberals" study group of Liberal Democratic Party (LDP), led by Koji Kakizawa, which became part of the New Frontier Party.

In 1996, Takaichi ran as sanctioned candidate from New Frontier Party and reelected to the House of Representatives (lower house). However New Frontier Party lost nationally. On November 5, she responded to recruitment from the Secretary-General of LDP Koichi Kato, and, then, joined the LDP. Her act of switching  party, two months after winning the election with anti-LDP votes, resulted in heavy criticism from New Frontier Party members.

In the LDP, Takaichi belonged to the Mori Faction (formally, the Seiwa Seisaku Kenkyū-kai) and she served as a Parliamentary Vice Minister for the Ministry of International Trade and Industry under Keizō Obuchi cabinet. She also served as chairman of Education and Science Committee.

In 2000, House of Representatives election she was placed in the first position in proportional representation ballot from LDP and easily won her third term. In 2002 she was appointed as the Senior Vice Minister of the Ministry of Economy, Trade and Industry under Junichiro Koizumi.

In the 2003 Japanese general election, she was defeated in the Nara 1st district by Democratic Party lawmaker Sumio Mabuchi. She moved to the nearby city of Ikoma and won a seat representing the Nara 2nd district in the 2005 Japanese general election. In 2004, while she was out of the Diet, she took an economics faculty position at Kinki University.

Takaichi headed an LDP group that opposed legislation that would allow married couples to retain separate surnames after marriage, arguing that it would undermine Japan's traditional family system. As communications chief she "stirred controversy when she suggested TV broadcasters could have their license revoked if they air programs the government considers politically biased, a remark widely slammed as tantamount to the repression of free speech".

She is affiliated with the ultranationalist organization Nippon Kaigi.

First Abe government
Takaichi served as Minister of State for Okinawa and Northern Territories Affairs, Minister of State for Science and Technology Policy, Minister of State for Innovation, Minister of State for Youth Affairs and Gender Equality and Minister of State for Food Safety in the Japanese Cabinet of Prime Minister Shinzō Abe. In August 2007, she was the only Abe cabinet member to join former Prime Minister Junichiro Koizumi in visiting Yasukuni Shrine on the anniversary of the end of World War II.

Second Abe government 
After the LDP's victory in the 2012 Japanese general election, Takaichi was appointed to head the party's Policy Research Council. In January 2013, she recommended that Abe issue an "Abe Statement" to replace the Murayama Statement that apologized for the damage inflicted by Japan through its colonial rule.

Takaichi was selected as Minister of Internal Affairs and Communications to replace Yoshitaka Shindō on September 3, 2014. After she was named as cabinet minister, a photograph was published of her together with Kazunari Yamada, the leader of National Socialist Japanese Workers' Party – a small neo-Nazi party in Japan. She denied any link with Yamada and said she wouldn't have accepted the picture had she known Yamada's background. She was also shown promoting a controversial book praising Adolf Hitler's electoral talents in 1994.

Takaichi was among the three members of the cabinet to visit the controversial Yasukuni Shrine in 2014, became the first sitting cabinet member to attend the shrine's autumn festival in 2016, and was one of four cabinet ministers who visited Yasukuni on the 75th anniversary of the end of World War II in August 2020.

In the December 2014 general election, she won an overwhelming 96,000-vote majority in her district, defeating the runner-up by 58,000 votes.

In February 2016, Takaichi commented that the government could suspend the operations of broadcasters that aired politically biased content. The U.S. State Department later described this as "[giving] rise to concerns about increasing government pressure against critical and independent media."

An electoral redistricting in 2017, which Takaichi oversaw as internal affairs minister, eliminated one of Nara Prefecture's districts and resulted in Takaichi again potentially facing off with her former rival Mabuchi.

Takaichi was replaced by Seiko Noda on August 3, 2017, but returned to the Internal Affairs and Communications post on September 11, 2019, replacing Masatoshi Ishida. Among other initiatives, she put pressure on NHK to cut its viewing fees and reform its governance, and oversaw the distribution of cash handouts during the COVID-19 pandemic.

2021 LDP leadership election 

In August 2021, Takaichi expressed her willingness to challenge incumbent Prime Minister Yoshihide Suga for the presidency of the LDP in the scheduled election on September 29. On September 3, Suga announced that he would not seek re-election; news media outlets reported the next day that former Prime Minister Abe had shifted his support to Takaichi. Suga himself supported rival candidate Taro Kono. She has been described as "a favorite of conservatives with hawkish views on defense and diplomacy".

Internal ministry document leak 
On March 2, 2023, opposition upper house member Hiroyuki Konishi said that he had obtained a document from the former administration of Shinzō Abe suggesting intentions to intervene in the freedom of broadcasting by putting political pressure on broadcasters that were critical to the Abe government and to the Liberal Democratic Party. Takaichi was Minister of Internal Affairs and Communications during the time frame referenced in the document. When pressed during a committee session the following day, Takaichi said that the document was "fabricated" and vowed to resign from the Diet if the document was proven to be genuine. Several days later, on March 7, 2023, the Internal Affairs ministry confirmed the authenticity of the document in question, and opposition Diet members called on Takaichi to resign. Following the announcement Takaichi backpedaled on her intention to quit and insisted that parts of the document referencing her were incorrect, adding that Konishi should bear the burden of proving the document's authenticity.

Political positions 
Takaichi is a conservative. She has expressed social conservative views including opposition to same sex-marriage and dual surnames. She claims dual surnames would lead to divorce and affairs.  Novelist Kyoko Nakajima says Takaichi has unabashedly maintained the attitudes and policies of Japan's current “paternalistic society,” thus making her “an honorary man.”

In regards to the economy she would continue Abenomics economic policies.

With regards to foreign policy, Takaichi supports revising article 9 of the Japanese constitution which prohibits Japan from entering armed conflict. A China-hawk, she has been critical of Chinese economic practices such as intellectual property theft and has supported less economic dependence on China.

Takaichi often cites Margaret Thatcher as a role model.

Personal life 
Takaichi married Taku Yamamoto, a fellow member of the House of Representatives, in 2004. They agreed to a divorce in July 2017, with Takaichi citing differing political views and aspirations as the reason for the divorce.

See Also 
 Tohokushinsha Film and Ministry of Internal Affairs and Communications scandal

References

External links
 Official website 

|-

|-

|-

|-

|-

|-

|-

1961 births
20th-century Japanese politicians
20th-century Japanese women politicians
21st-century Japanese politicians
21st-century Japanese women politicians
Women government ministers of Japan
Female interior ministers
Female members of the House of Representatives (Japan)
Government ministers of Japan
Kobe University alumni
Liberal Democratic Party (Japan) politicians
Living people
Members of Nippon Kaigi
Members of the House of Representatives (Japan)
Ministers of Internal Affairs of Japan
New Frontier Party (Japan) politicians
People from Nara, Nara
Spouses of Japanese politicians
Tenrikyo
United States congressional aides
Politicians from Nara Prefecture